George Hays (August 29, 1924 – April 20, 2007) was a defensive end in the National Football League.

Biography
Hays was born George William Hays in Glassport, Pennsylvania. Hays was inducted into the Mon Valley Sports Hall of Fame on December 16, 1977, at the Big Ten Banquet.

Career
George Hays served in the US Army during World War II. He played football at the collegiate level at St. Bonaventure University.  Then he spent three seasons (1950–1952) with the Pittsburgh Steelers, before playing his final season with the Green Bay Packers in 1953.  He played as a defensive end for both teams.   

After his NFL career, he worked as a school teacher for the Elizabeth Forward School District.  He also taught at Glassport High School, Monessen City School District, and Braddock High School.  All four districts are located in southwestern Pennsylvania.  He was also a football coach for the University of Dayton.

See also
List of Pittsburgh Steelers players
List of Green Bay Packers players

References

1924 births
2007 deaths
People from Glassport, Pennsylvania
Pittsburgh Steelers players
Green Bay Packers players
American football defensive ends
High school football coaches in Pennsylvania
Dayton Flyers football coaches
United States Army soldiers
United States Army personnel of World War II
St. Bonaventure Brown Indians football players
Players of American football from Pennsylvania